Bunting is a surname. Notable people with the surname include:

Shane Bunting, (born 1975) better known as Madchild; Canadian-born rap artist
Arthur Bunting, British rugby league footballer and coach
Basil Bunting (1900–1985), British modernist poet
Bill Bunting (born 1947), American basketball player
Chris Bunting, British comic book writer
Christopher Bunting (1925–2005), English cellist
Christopher William Bunting (1837–1896), Irish-born Canadian politician
David Michael Bunting (born 1960), British poet/musician
Edward Bunting (1773–1843), Irish musician
Edward L. Bunting (1883–1962), English cricketer
Eve Bunting (born 1928), Californian author
Heinrich Bünting (1545–1606), German pastor, theologian and mapmaker
Hem Bunting (born 1985), Cambodian athlete
Ian Bunting (born 1996), American football player
Jabez Bunting (1779–1858), British Wesleyan Methodist minister
Jo Bunting, television producer
John Bunting (serial killer) (born 1966), Australian serial killer
John Bunting (coach) (born 1950), American football coach
Josiah Bunting III (born 1939), American educator
La Farrell Bunting (born 1980), American boxer
Madeleine Bunting, British journalist
Mary Bunting (1910–1998), American President of Radcliffe College
Michael Bunting (born 1995), Canadian ice hockey player
Robert Franklin Bunting (1828–1891), American Presbyterian minister and Confederate chaplain.
Ronald Bunting, British army officer
Ronnie Bunting (died 1980), Irish political activist
Sean Murphy-Bunting (born 1997), American football player
Stephen Bunting (born 1985), British darts player
Thomas L. Bunting (1844–1898), American politician
William Bunting (1874–1947), English rugby player
William Bunting (eco-warrior) (1916–1995), English environmentalist and eco-warrior

Fictional characters:
Reverend Bunting, character in The Invisible Man

Surnames from nicknames